Rangherka (Rangheri House), also called Vršovický zámeček (Vršovice Castle)  is a former silk factory, today Neo-Renaissance representative building from the 19th century, which stands in Vršovice in Prague 10, Czech Republic. Named according to its first owner Giuseppe Rangheri. The building is a state-protected cultural monument.

Buildings and structures in Prague
Prague 10